This is a list of the Premiers of the Republic of China since 1912. The Republic of China before 1949 controlled Mainland China as well as offshore islands. The Republic of China since 1949 has only controlled Taiwan and nearby islands. The current Republic of China is usually known as Taiwan. In the country's history, the official title of the head of government has changed over time.

Premiers, also known as Presidents of the Executive Yuan, are appointed by the Presidents of the Republic of China, but some premiers were even more powerful than the presidents, during the early age of the Republic of China. Some presidents were even expelled by the premiers they appointed.
The title of premier in China was changed several times, so this list is divided into several sections.

List

Premiers of the Cabinet of the Republic of China (1912–1914)
 Period: 13 March 1912 – 1 May 1914
According to the Provisional Constitution of Republic of China, which was passed in 1912, the leader of the majority party or the majority coalition should be appointed premier by the president.

Secretaries of State of the Republic of China (1914–1916)
 Period: 1 May 1914 – 21 December 1915; 22 March 1916 – 29 June 1916

Premiers of the State Council of the Republic of China (1916–1928)
 Period: 29 June 1916 – 3 June 1928

Presidents of the Executive Yuan of the National Government of the Republic of China (1928–1948) 
 Period: 25 October 1928 – 24 May 1948

When Chiang Kai-shek established the Nanking Nationalist government in 1928, he created a presidency for the Executive Yuan instead of a premiership, in order to show the difference between his government and the previous one in Peking (then renamed Beiping). This government moved to Chongqing during the Sino-Japanese War (1937–1945) and during the Chinese Civil War relocated to Taipei where it exists today.

Presidents of the Executive Yuan of the Republic of China (1948–present)
 Period: 25 May 1948 – present

Timeline

Nationalist Government (1928-1948)

Constitutional Government (1948-)

Rank in length by total tenure

References

See also
 List of presidents of the Republic of China
 List of rulers of Taiwan
 List of vice presidents of the Republic of China
 Vice Premier of the Republic of China
 List of political office-holders of the Republic of China by age

 
 
Premiers
Premiers
Political office-holders in the Republic of China on Taiwan
Political office-holders in the Republic of China
Premiers Taiwan
Republic of China
Premier